Taqi Muhammad Baharna (born in 1930) is a Bahraini poet, diplomat, and businessman. He was born in the capital of Manama. Educated in literature and economics, he has served as Bahrain’s ambassador to Egypt and headed Bahrain’s mission to the Arab League. He has also published his poetry and literature in a number of Bahraini and Arab periodicals, and he has written several books.

Biography
Born in 1930, Baharna was raised in his native Manama. He was educated at schools in Bahrain and Baghdad, then took university courses on literature, economics, and Arab and Islamic affairs. He was self-employed but also became a member of the boards of a number of banks, insurance companies, chambers of commerce, and other financial institutions. Appointed to several state councils, committees, and official institutions, he served as Bahrain’s ambassador to Egypt (the Kingdom’s first) and headed its inaugural mission to the Arab League as a permanent delegate in 1974. He served on the Consultative Council, the nation’s upper house of Parliament, and chaired its Foreign Affairs Committee from 1993 to 2002.

Awards
 Order of Merit (Egypt) (1973)
 National Merit Award from Prime Minister Khalifa bin Salman Al Khalifa (1992)
 King Hamad bin Isa Al Khalifa Medal (2001)
 Bahrain History and Antiquities Association Medal (2012)

Books
Poetry collections:
 بنات الشعر (“Girl Poetry,” 1996)
 في خاطري يبكي الحنين (“Crying Nostalgia in My Mind,” 2003)
 من يضيء السراج (“Who Shines the Lamp,” 2009)
 في الفجر تضيء الكلمات (“At Dawn, the Words Light Up,” 2020)
Nonfiction:
 من عيون الشعر العربي (“Through the Eyes of Arabic Poetry,” anthology from the pre-Islamic to the modern era)
 أوراق ملوّنة (“Colored Paper,” biography)
 نادي العروبة (“Al-Orouba SC,” 1992
 مذكرات سفير البحرين والخليج العربي في عهد الاستقلال (diary from his diplomatic service days)

References

Members of the Consultative Council (Bahrain)
Members of the National Assembly (Bahrain)
Bahraini diplomats
20th-century Bahraini poets
21st-century Bahraini poets
Bahraini writers
1930 births
Living people